Un' Ora prima di Amleto, più Pinocchio is an Italian film which was released in 1965.

External links
 

1965 films
Italian short documentary films
1960s Italian-language films
1960s Italian films